The clouded monitor (Varanus nebulosus) is a species of monitor lizard, native to Burma, Thailand and Indochina to West Malaysia, Singapore, Java, and Sumatra. They are excellent tree climbers.  It belongs to the subgenus Empagusia along with the Bengal monitor, the Dumeril's monitor and other monitor lizards. It had previously been listed as a subspecies of Varanus bengalensis by some herpetologists. It is a diurnal monitor.

Description

Clouded monitors can on occasion grow up to 1.5 metres long.

References

Varanus
Reptiles of Southeast Asia
Reptiles of Myanmar
Reptiles of Cambodia
Reptiles of India
Reptiles of Indonesia
Reptiles of the Malay Peninsula
Reptiles of Thailand
Reptiles of Vietnam
Reptiles described in 1831
Taxa named by John Edward Gray